Allegheny Aqueduct, also known as Gibraltar Aqueduct, is a historic stone aqueduct located at Robeson Township in Berks County, Pennsylvania. It was built as part of the Schuylkill Navigation Company canal system to carry canal boats across the Allegheny Creek. It is supported by a stone arch bridge structure with five spans. The aqueduct was in operation until 1928, and drained in 1967.

It was listed on the National Register of Historic Places in 1984.

Gallery

References 

Buildings and structures on the National Register of Historic Places in Pennsylvania
Transport infrastructure completed in 1824
Transportation buildings and structures in Berks County, Pennsylvania
1824 establishments in Pennsylvania
Water supply infrastructure on the National Register of Historic Places
National Register of Historic Places in Berks County, Pennsylvania